Uzun Hikâye (A Long Story) is a 2012 Turkish drama film, co-produced by Suat Kapkı and Taner Özbel written by Yiğit Güralp and directed by Osman Sınav based on a novella by Mustafa Kutlu. The movie premiered on October 12, 2012.

Plot
The movie, spanning a time from the 1940s to the 1970s, features a dramatic as well as bright and charged story.

After becoming orphan at an early age, Ali (starring Kenan İmirzalıoğlu) immigrates to Turkey from Bulgaria with his oil wrestler grandfather Süleyman. Settled at Eyüp in İstanbul, he is raised by his grandfather as a brave and equalitarian individual.

During his teen years in the 1950s, Ali falls in love with Münire (starring Tuğçe Kazaz), the daughter of an outdoor cinema owner. Ali abducts Münire as her parents does not allow their marriage. From then on, Ali spends a life together with the woman he loves, moving from town to town at railway stations. In the meantime, the couple welcome a son they name Mustafa. Ali, nicknamed now "the Socialist", earns a living by his typewriting and accounting knowledge. He is, however, sacked by plotting towners because of his intolerant character against injustice and discrimination. Meanwhile, Mustafa is growing and pursues his own life stories.

Cast

References

External links
 

2012 films
Turkish drama films
2010s Turkish-language films
Films set in Turkey
Films directed by Osman Sınav
2012 drama films